Anemonastrum baicalense is a species of flowering plant in the genus Anemonastrum. It is native to forests, scrub, and grassy places at 500–3100 m. altitude in Siberia, Mongolia, northern China, and North Korea in Northeast Asia.

References

 Turczaninow, Bull. Soc. Imp. Naturalistes Moscou. 15: 40. 1842.

baicalense
Flora of Northeast Asia
Flora of Mongolia
Flora of Siberia
Flora of China
Flora of Korea
Taxa named by Nikolai Turczaninow